Ryan Matthew Miller (born November 21, 1972) is an American musician. He is the lead singer for the alternative rock band Guster playing guitar, piano and bass.

Life and career
Ryan was born on November 21, 1972, in Lubbock, Texas, to Ross and Cookie Miller. He grew up as an only child and was raised in Dallas, Texas, graduating from Berkner High School in 1991, where he had his own band, the Silents.

He majored in religious studies at Tufts University and graduated with a bachelor of arts in 1995.  He has since pursued a full-time career in music and art. Guster was formed when Miller met bandmates Adam Gardner and Brian Rosenworcel while the three were freshmen at Tufts University in August 1991, a few years later, they met bandmate Joe Pisapia.

Film Composer 
Miller composed the scores for films Safety Not Guaranteed (2012), The Kings of Summer (2013), In a World... (2013), Tig (2015),The Fundamentals of Caring (2016), Mr. Roosevelt (2017) and The Last Summer (2019) and How It Ends (2021), the television show Playing House (2017).

Songwriter 
Miller has had several collaborations with other artists such as "Your Hand I Will Never Let It Go" written by Miller for Stevie Nicks and the film Book of Henry,  "The Clown" with Dave Eggers for his 30 Days, 30 Songs project as well as co-producing "Words" with Sharon Van Etten for the film Tig.

Television Host 
Spurred by a move from NYC to Vermont, Miller created a TV series on Vermont PBS called Makin' Friends with Ryan Miller in which he travels around the state making friends with "high functioning weirdos". He then served as the creative director and host of Vermont PBS' live music and interview show Bardo interviewing tune-yards, San Holo, Lake Street Dive among others.

Miller has appeared as a guest several times on The George Lucas Talk Show, as well as providing multiple theme songs for their various fundraisers and the theme song for their current weekly broadcast. He appeared on the 2017 stage show performance titled Thank the Maker, as well as their May the AR Be LI$$ You Arli$$ marathon fundraiser, and The George Lucas Holiday Special in 2020. During the pandemic, Miller hosted a web series that featured guests like Mike Gordon.

Writer 
Miller is co-writer, with director Rob Perez, of the 2009 movie Nobody and served as the film's composer.

Miller has written about his experience as a touring musician during Covid for The Atlantic, articulating his experience headlining Red Rocks "I Performed A Career Highlight Show, Then Delta Hit" and "Omicron's Blow To Live Music".

In 2021, Miller launched a Substack newsletter called Weird And Wonderful World where he writes about sandwiches, tiny museums, haunted houses, art installations and other weird/wonderful places and things.

Animation Project 
Miller and Alex Plapinger co-created the animated short series "Pretty Good Story", a 10-episode series hosted by Miller and with hand painted frames by musician/artist John Andrews (Woods, Cut Worms).

References

External links
"Nobody" Trailer page on Apple.com

American rock guitarists
American male guitarists
Tufts University alumni
Singers from Texas
People from Richardson, Texas
1972 births
Living people
People from Lubbock, Texas
Guster members
Guitarists from Texas
21st-century American singers
21st-century American guitarists
21st-century American male singers